Johannes "Hans" Siegert (10 August 1914 – 25 October 1966) was a football defender on the East Germany national football team. He was also a defender for FC Mecklenburg Schwerin from 1949 to 1950.

Club career
Hans made 21 appearances for Mecklenburg, and also scoring a goal he played in the DDR-Oberliga, which was the East German football top-tier league.

International career
He made 3 caps in 1954. He also was a manager for the side.

References

External links

East German footballers
1914 births
1966 deaths
German footballers needing infoboxes
Association football defenders